XHTR-FM is a radio station on 92.5 FM in Villahermosa, Tabasco. It is owned by Radiorama and carries its La Poderosa grupera format.

History

XHTR received its concession on February 26, 1996. It has always been owned by Radiorama.

References

Radio stations in Tabasco